Ryszard Kotala - Polish volleyball player. He was a member of Czarni Radom team which was promoted to the second level league in 1979 and in 1983-84 season to Ektraklasa. In 1988 with the team, Kotala came 4th in the league, which was the highest place in his career.

References 

Polish men's volleyball players
Czarni Radom players
Place of birth missing (living people)